Universitario de Deportes' 2012 season is the club's 84th season in the Primera División of Peru and 47th in the Torneo Descentralizado. The club's under-20 team will compete in the 2012 U-20 Copa Libertadores as defending champions.

Players

Squad information

In

Out

Competitions

Torneo Descentralizado

The ADFP ruled that Universitario will play in the Estadio Monumental "U" behind closed doors for the first two home games of the 2012 season as punishment for the death of a supporter in the last Peruvian Clásico of the 2011 season.

Results summary

Results by round

Matches

Copa del Inca

U-20 Copa Libertadores

Goal scorers

Assists table

References

2012
Universitario De Deportes